Frank Jair Osorio Carvajal (born 28 August 1987 in Carmen de Viboral), is a Colombian cyclist, who currently rides for UCI Continental team .

Major results
2011
1st Stage 12 Vuelta a Colombia
2016
1st Stage 8 Vuelta a Colombia
2021
4th Time trial, National Road Championships
2022
9th Time trial, National Road Championships

References

External links

1987 births
Living people
Colombian male cyclists
Sportspeople from Antioquia Department